Zbigniew Robakiewicz (born 28 November 1966) is a retired Polish football goalkeeper.

References

1966 births
Living people
Polish footballers
ŁKS Łódź players
Legia Warsaw players
Iraklis Thessaloniki F.C. players
Ceramika Opoczno players
Dyskobolia Grodzisk Wielkopolski players
Widzew Łódź players
Tur Turek players
Association football goalkeepers
Ekstraklasa players
Super League Greece players
Poland international footballers
Polish expatriate footballers
Expatriate footballers in Greece
Polish expatriate sportspeople in Greece